AFM may refer to:

Organizations 
 AFM Records, a German record label
 Africa Fighting Malaria, a health campaign in Africa
 Alex von Falkenhausen Motorenbau, a German racing car constructor
 American Federation of Motorcyclists, a road racing club in the US
 American Federation of Musicians, a labor union of musicians in North America
 American Film Market, an annual event for the financing of film production and distribution
 American Freedom Mortgage, Inc., a corporation based in Georgia, U.S.
 Apostolic Faith Mission of South Africa, a Pentecostal Christian denomination in South Africa
 Australia First Movement, an Australian fascist organisation during the second world war.
 Autoriteit Financiële Markten, Netherlands financial markets regulator
 Macau Football Association, the governing body of football in Macau
 Armed Forces of Malta, the name given to the combined armed services of Malta

Publications 
 Aquarium Fish Magazine, a North American monthly magazine
 Annals of the Four Masters, a chronicle of medieval Irish history

Science, technology, and medicine 
 AFM (gene), in biochemistry, a member of the albumin gene family that encodes the protein Afamin
 Abrasive flow machining, a technique for smoothing internal part surfaces
 Active fuel management (formerly "Displacement on Demand"), a trademarked name for the automobile variable displacement technology from General Motors
 Acute flaccid myelitis, a neurologic disease similar to polio
 Adobe font metrics, a computer file format
 Air flow meter, a device that measures how much air is flowing through a tube
 AFm phase, or "Alumina, Ferric oxide, monosulfate" phase, in chemistry
 Antiferromagnetism, a material property and type of magnetic ordering
 Atomic force microscope, a high-resolution type of scanning probe microscope
 Audio frequency modulation, an audio recording standard
 Aircraft flight manual (AFM), a book containing information required to operate an aircraft

Military 
 Air Force Medal, awarded in the Royal Air Force (UK)
 United States Air Force Memorial, in Arlington, Virginia
 Armed Forces of Malta, the name given to the combined armed services of Malta
 Republic of China Armed Forces Museum, a museum in Taipei, Taiwan

Other
 Artificial financial market an approach in finance and economics to dealing with heterogeneity